The 2019–20 FA Women's League Cup was the ninth edition of the FA Women's Super League and FA Women's Championship's league cup competition. It was sponsored by Continental AG, who sponsored the competition since its creation, and is officially known as the FA Women's Continental League Cup for sponsorship reasons. All 23 teams from the FA Women's Super League and FA Women's Championship contested the competition - the largest field in the history of the cup and an increase of one from the previous year's competition.

Manchester City were the defending champions. As of the start the competition, only Manchester City and Arsenal had previously won the cup in the eight seasons it has previously been contested in.

Format changes
The 2019–20 Women's League Cup kept the same format including an initial group stage that has been used since the 2017–18 edition but expanded by one to accommodate the increase in teams in the top two divisions of women's football to 23. The season was intended to be the first in which the FA WSL and FA Championship both had twelve teams, allowing for a league cup group stage with four equal groups of six teams. However, the demotion of Yeovil Town from the WSL to the third tier FA Women's National League meant that, though the competition would have its highest ever number of participants, one group would still have to contain only five clubs.

Group stage

Group A

Group B

Group C

Group D

Knock-out stage

Quarter-finals

The draw for this round was made live via Talksport 2 on 16 December 2019 with the winners of each group all receiving home advantage. The round took place on Wednesday 15 January 2020 and contained two FA Women's Championship teams, double the amount that reached the quarter-finals the previous season.

Semi-finals

The draw for this round took place on 18 January 2019 and was broadcast live on BT Sport Score. The round took place on 29 January 2020 and contained the same four semi-finalists as the previous season.

Final

On 16 January, it was announced the 2020 FA Women's League Cup Final would be held at the City Ground, the home of Nottingham Forest, for the first time. The game was televised live domestically on BT Sport and internationally via the FA's own streaming service the FA Player.

See also
2019–20 FA WSL
2019–20 FA Women's Championship

References

External links
Official website

FA Women's League Cup
Cup